Libertarianism (from , meaning "freedom"; from , meaning "libertarian") is a political philosophy and movement that upholds liberty as the highest political end. Libertarianism may also refer to:
 Anarchism, an anti-authoritarian and anti-statist philosophy for which some use the term libertarianism synonymously
 Civil libertarianism, a strain of political thought that emphasizes the supremacy of individual rights and personal freedoms over and against any kind of authority
 Left-libertarianism, a position contrasted with that of right-libertarianism which rejects the private ownership of natural resources
 Libertarian Party (disambiguation) 
 List of libertarian organizations
 Libertarianism in South Africa
 Libertarianism in the United Kingdom
 Libertarianism in the United States
 Libertarian socialism, a group of philosophies which aspire to create a non-hierarchical society without private ownership of the means of production or an authoritarian state
 Metaphysical libertarianism, philosophical position supporting free will against determinism
 Right-libertarianism, a position contrasted with that of left-libertarianism for its explicit support of free-market capitalism and private property rights

See also 
 Anarchism in Spain
 
 
 Libertarian liberalism (disambiguation), a term used variously by different scholars
 Libertinism, sometimes called moral libertarianism and contrasted to political or social libertarianism and metaphysical libertarianism